Jason Kapalka (born 1970) is a Canadian game developer and entrepreneur based in the Comox Valley, British Columbia. He is best known as one of the founders, along with John Vechey and Brian Fiete, of the video game studio PopCap Games, which was founded in 2000 and sold to Electronic Arts in 2011; PopCap was originally titled “Sexy Action Cool,” but the name was changed when it was found to be misleading to many players. Kapalka is listed at #82 on IGN's list of the top 100 game creators of all time.

PopCap Games

Kapalka was the designer of Bejeweled (2000), PopCap Games' first major hit and an early example of "freemium" casual games. The game was originally known as "Diamond Mine", after a song by the Canadian band Blue Rodeo, but was changed to Bejeweled at Microsoft's insistence. By 2013, variations of Bejeweled had been downloaded over 100 million times.

From 2000 to 2011, Kapalka was the chief game designer at PopCap and worked on many titles including Peggle, Zuma, Alchemy and other popular casual games in the mid 2000s.

With Plants vs. Zombies, Kapalka and the team at PopCap took the risk of hiring designer George Fan away from Blizzard Entertainment for a long development cycle on an offbeat title: as he told Digital Spy, "It's possible where it was a case where it was too weird, too hardcore and too scary for the soccer mums, and where it's too cutesy for hardcore players." The initial release as a PC downloadable for casual players was not successful, but the game later developed a following among Steam players, then Xbox, and then became a major hit on smartphones, paving the way for a variety of sequels and spin-offs.

PopCap sold to Electronic Arts in 2011, and Kapalka left the company in 2014 to pursue a variety of other projects.

Current projects

Blue Wizard Digital 

Soon after his departure from PopCap, Kapalka founded Blue Wizard Digital, a video game development studio and publisher specializing in campy horror games and shooters, including Slayaway Camp and an officially licensed Friday the 13th puzzle game that has been released for the Nintendo Switch. "I wanted to try working on some games that were out of PopCap’s normal range... stuff that was too violent or weird or hardcore for PopCap," Kapalka has said of his choice of genre.

Storm Crow Alliance 

In 2011, Kapalka opened Storm Crow Tavern in Vancouver, envisioning it as a "sports bar for geeks"; Storm Crow Alehouse followed in 2015. In 2018, the Storm Crow brand expanded to Toronto with Storm Crow Manor, housed in a grand heritage manor dating to 1877, which the Toronto Star calls "basically like a Planet Hollywood or Hard Rock Café, but it celebrates genre entertainment of all kinds". Kapalka plans to continue to expand the Storm Crow brand.

The Mysterious Package Company 

Kapalka became involved with the Mysterious Package Company in 2013, after spotting a strange crate on the shelf at the home of a friend, Mass Effect and The Long Dark voice actor Mark Meer, and tracking down the manufacturer. He became their primary investor and advisor in 2014.

The company specializes in the delivery of highly detailed “fake” experiences via mail, which tell a strange or science-fictional story, and typically culminate in the delivery of a nailed-shut wooded crate containing a bizarre hand-crafted artifact.

The Mysterious Package Company has since grown into an enterprise that employs dozens of people in Toronto, and which has shipped tens of thousands of “experiences” worldwide.

In July 2015, a Kickstarter for a new Mysterious Package Company product, "The Century Beast", raised nearly half a million dollars. In 2016, a Kickstarter for another product, "Filigree in Shadow", raised even more, making the two Kickstarters among the most successful ever in their category.

References

External links 

Blue Wizard Games
Storm Crow Alliance
The Mysterious Package Company

PopCap games
Video game developers
Canadian video game designers
Living people
1970 births